Anthony Newley (24 September 1931 – 14 April 1999) was an English actor, singer, songwriter, and filmmaker. A "latter-day British Al Jolson", he achieved widespread success in song, and on stage and screen. "One of Broadway's greatest leading men", from 1959 to 1962 he scored a dozen entries on  the UK Top 40 chart, including two number one hits. Newley won the 1963 Grammy Award for Song of the Year for "What Kind of Fool Am I", sung by Sammy Davis Jr., and wrote "Feeling Good", which became a signature hit for Nina Simone. His songs have been performed by a wide variety of artists including Fiona Apple, Tony Bennett, Barbra Streisand, Michael Bublé and Mariah Carey.

With songwriting partner Leslie Bricusse, Newley was nominated for an Academy Award for the film score of Willy Wonka & the Chocolate Factory (1971), featuring "Pure Imagination", which has been covered by dozens of artists. He collaborated with John Barry on the title song for the James Bond film Goldfinger (1964), sung by Shirely Bassey. An "icon of the early 1960s", his TV series, The Strange World of Gurney Slade, "continues to have a cult following due to its advanced postmodern premise that [he] is trapped inside a television programme." 

Described by The Guinness Book of British Hit Singles & Albums as "among the most innovative UK acts of the early rock years before moving into musicals and cabaret", Newley was inducted into the Songwriters Hall of Fame in 1989.

Early life
Newley was born on 24 September 1931 in the London district of Hackney to Frances Grace Newley, and George Kirby, who were not married and separated soon after his birth. As "the son of a single mother, who waited on him hand and foot – even after he was married", Newley "mourned the absence of his real father, until, at 82, a jobbing builder made himself known." He was Jewish through his maternal grandmother. When his parents separated, his aunt and uncle brought him up through unofficial adoption. During the Second World War, he was evacuated to a foster home in the countryside safe from the Blitz aerial bombing attacks on London. For a time, he stayed with George Pescud, a retired music hall performer whom he later credited with inspiring his freedom of self-expression.

Newley attended Clapton Park Lower School, now named Mandeville Primary School, which today recognises him as an alumnus with an official plaque. Although recognised as very bright by his teachers, by the age of fourteen he had left education and was working as an office boy for an advertising agency in Fleet Street called Hannaford and Goodman.

Prompted by an advertisement in The Daily Telegraph entitled "Boy Actors Urgently Wanted", he applied to the Italia Conti Stage School, only to discover that the fees were too high. Nevertheless, after a brief audition, he was offered a job as an office boy on a salary of 30 shillings a week plus tuition at the school. While serving tea one afternoon he caught the eye of producer Geoffrey de Barkus, who cast Newley as the title character in the children's film serial, Dusty Bates (aka, The Adventures of Dusty Bates, 1947).

Career

Early career
Newley followed Dusty Bates with an appearance as Dick Bultitude in Peter Ustinov's Vice Versa (1948). One of the stars of the film was Kay Walsh, whose ex-husband David Lean was about to direct a screen version of Oliver Twist. Walsh rang Lean and told him, "I've found your Artful Dodger". During the 1950s, Newley made twenty-seven movies for J. Arthur Rank, many of them in the United States, "comfortably transitioning from child to adult actor". At this time he also performed national service. During the decade, Newley appeared in many British radio programmes, including as Cyril in Floggits, which starred Elsie and Doris Waters, and also "became increasingly involved with the theatre."

Mainstream successes
Newley starred in the 1958 film No Time to Die (also known as Tank Force). The following year, "[a] turning point came with a literally star-making role in the low-budget musical film", Idol on Parade. Newley was cast as a rock singer called up for national service in a story which was somewhat inspired by Elvis Presley, who had recently been drafted for army service in the United States. The performance cemented Newley's position as a leading man. The film also launched his career as a pop singer, with the song "I've Waited So Long" – which featured in the soundtrack – reaching number 3 in the UK charts. This was quickly followed by his number 6 hit "Personality" and then two number 1 hits in early 1960: "Why" (originally a 1959 US hit for Frankie Avalon) and "Do You Mind?" (written by Lionel Bart).

TV work, music stardom
The ATV series The Strange World of Gurney Slade (1960) starred Newley, who was also its creator. A comedy series of six half-hour programmes, it develops from a premise established in the opening scene, Newley's character escapes from a television programme which is Gurney Slade itself. Now considered ahead of its time, the series was quickly moved from a peak-time slot.

His career both as a singer and a songwriter quickly went from strength to strength. In 1963, Newley won the Grammy Award for Song of the Year for having penned "What Kind of Fool Am I?". That year he also had a hit comedy album called Fool Britannia!, the result of improvisational satires of the British Profumo scandal of the time by a team of Newley, his then wife Joan Collins, and Peter Sellers. It peaked at number 10 in the UK Albums Chart in October 1963. Newley sang "Gonna Build a Mountain", "Once in a Lifetime", "On a Wonderful Day Like Today", "Who Can I Turn To?," "The Joker," and comic novelty songs such as "That Noise", "The Oompa-Loompa Song" and his version of "Pop Goes the Weasel". Newley also released a successful rendition of "Strawberry Fair", featuring his trademark cockney accent.

Among the many hit songs Newley wrote for others made hits are "Goldfinger" (the title song of the James Bond film, Goldfinger, music by John Barry), and "Feeling Good", which became a hit for Nina Simone and the rock band Muse, as well as a signature song for singer Michael Bublé. His compositions have been recorded by artists as diverse as Harry Connick, Jr. and Mariah Carey. Some of the many ballads he wrote, usually with Leslie Bricusse, became signature hits for Sammy Davis Jr., Shirley Bassey and Tony Bennett. The two men referred to themselves as the team of "Brickman and Newburg", with "Newburg" concentrating mainly on the music and "Brickman" on the lyrics. Ian Fraser often devised their arrangements.

Despite the fact that such compositions as "What Kind of Fool Am I?" and "The Candy Man" (a US Number One single for Sammy Davis Jr. and the Mike Curb Congregation in 1972) became international hits, Newley had less chart success in the United States as a recording artist, charting on the Billboard Hot 100 with four singles from 1960 to 1962, none reaching higher than number 67. However, he later had a number 12 hit on the Adult Contemporary charts in 1976 with "Teach the Children".

Stage and screen
Throughout the 1960s, Newley enjoyed sustained success on London's West End theatre, on Broadway, in Hollywood films, and on British and American television. He and Bricusse also wrote musicals. Stop the World – I Want to Get Off, in which Newley also performed, earned him nomination for a Tony Award for Best Leading Actor in a Musical. A hit in London and on Broadway, it was made into a film version in 1966, in which Newley was unable to star owing to a schedule conflict. The other musicals for which he co-wrote music and lyrics with Bricusse included The Roar of the Greasepaint – The Smell of the Crowd (1965) and Willy Wonka & the Chocolate Factory (1971), based on the children's book by Roald Dahl.

Newley played Matthew Mugg in the original Doctor Dolittle (1967), a difficult experience in part because of the hostility he endured from the lead actor, Rex Harrison, and he also played the repressed English businessman opposite Sandy Dennis in the original Sweet November (1968). He hosted Lucille Ball's character on a whirlwind tour of London in Lucy in London (1966). He performed in the autobiographical, Fellini-esque and X-rated Can Heironymus Merkin Ever Forget Mercy Humppe and Find True Happiness? (1969), which he also directed and co-wrote with Herman Raucher. The film is "a surrealist sex-drenched disaster that could only ever have been made in the more free-wheeling Sixties", and starred his then-wife, Joan Collins, who said that his self-serving behaviour prompted her to get a divorce.

Newley also directed the 1971 film Summertree, starring Michael Douglas and Brenda Vaccaro. He appeared as Quilp in Mister Quilp (1975) (based on Dickens's The Old Curiosity Shop), for which he composed some songs ('Love Has the Longest Memory of All'). His last feature role, in the cast of the long-running British TV soap opera EastEnders, was to have been a regular role, but Newley had to withdraw after a few months when his health began to fail.

Newley's contributions to Christmas music are highlighted by his rendition of the "Coventry Carol" which appears on many anthologies. He also wrote and recorded a novelty Christmas song called "Santa Claus is Elvis", and recorded an album of spoken poetry.

Later life
"In the early Seventies Newley became a tax exile and went to live in Florida." He remained active throughout that decade, particularly as a Las Vegas and Catskills Borscht Belt resort performer, game show panelist (such as on Hollywood Squares) and talk show guest. Newley "was among the top five cabaret acts in America for some years", but gradually his career had begun to flounder. He had taken risks that eventually led to his downfall in Hollywood. Throughout the 1980s and 1990s, he worked to achieve a comeback. In the summer of 1983, Newley was the lead in Chaplin, a Broadway-bound musical he co-wrote with Stanley Ralph Ross, that never made it out of previews in Los Angeles. A planned Broadway opening was canceled after the production lost $4 million.

He briefly appeared on Late Night with David Letterman (when in town to be inducted into the Songwriters' Hall of Fame) to sing the theme to "Viewer Mail". He staged a successful American tour of his Stop The World – I Want To Get Off in 1986–87. The production co-starred a then unknown Suzie Plakson, whom Newley had discovered. The tour yielded her some strong notices and led to a steady career on stage and television. He was also featured as the Mad Hatter in Irwin Allen's all-star television adaptation of Alice in Wonderland (1985). That year he was diagnosed with cancer and had one kidney removed. Returning to England, he moved in with his mother Gracie in Esher, Surrey.

With his cancer arrested, he continued to work, appearing as a car-dealer in the soap opera EastEnders and recording songs from Fiddler on the Roof and Scrooge. He enjoyed his final popular success onstage starring in the latter musical, which showed in London and toured British cities including Liverpool, Birmingham, Bristol and Manchester, in the 1990s. In 1996, Newley "made a rare nightclub appearance in New York at Rainbow and Stars, where the emotive force of his singing was undiminished". He summed up the previous two decades in remarks from the stage: "I went to Vegas for 22 years, married some absolutely charming women and gave them all my money. That's why I'm here."

At the time of his death, Newley had been working on a musical of Shakespeare's Richard III. He died of renal cancer at the age of 67, soon after he had become a grandfather.

In recognition of his creative skills and body of work, Newley was elected to the Songwriters Hall of Fame in 1989.

Personal life
Newley was married three times; firstly, to Ann Lynn (1956–1963) with whom he had one son, Simon, who died in infancy from a congenital infirmity. Following their divorce, he married Joan Collins (1963–1970). The couple had two children, Tara Newley and Alexander (Sacha) Newley. Tara became a broadcaster in Britain and Sacha is a portrait artist based in New York City.

His third marriage was to former air hostess Dareth Newly Dunn (née Rich) (1971–1989), with whom he also had a daughter and son, Shelby and Christopher. In an episode of Angela and Friends (Sky One), Tara Newley also mentioned another sister, a third living daughter of Newley. Newley's stepfather, Ronald Gardner, reportedly later lived in Beverly Hills working as a chauffeur.

Actress Anneke Wills "began a relationship with Anthony Newley" when she 17, and working with him on the TV series The Strange World of Gurney Slade. In an interview, she recalled moving in with Newley, and listening to The Goons together.

With the help of a detective, Newley searched for and found his father, George Kirby. His mother then "began a correspondence with her long lost love." Newley flew him out to Los Angeles and bought them a house, where they lived until George died.

Death and legacy
Newley died on 14 April 1999, in Jensen Beach, Florida, from renal cancer at the age of 67. He had first been diagnosed with cancer in 1985, and it returned in 1997 and spread to his lungs and liver. He was said to have died in the arms of his companion, the designer Gina Fratini. He was survived by his five children, a granddaughter Miel, and his mother Grace, then aged 96. Since then two more grandchildren have been born: Weston (Tara's second child) and Ava Grace (Sacha's first, with his former wife Angela Tassoni).

Books, recordings, tributes
Newley's life is the subject of a biography by Garth Bardsley called Stop the World (London: Oberon, 2003). 2013 saw the publication of Dear Tony, a book about a long-lasting friendship with a young American woman with whom he fell in love.

Amongst the many compilations of his recordings are Anthony Newley: The Decca Years (1959–1964), Once in a Lifetime: The Anthony Newley Collection (1960–71), and Anthony Newley's Greatest Hits (Deram). In May 2010, Stage Door Records released a compilation of unreleased Newley recordings entitled Newley Discovered. Produced with the Anthony Newley Society and Newley's family, the album contains the concept recordings for Newley's self-penned film musicals Can Heironymus Merkin Ever Forget Mercy Humppe and Find True Happiness?, Willy Wonka & the Chocolate Factory and Mr. Quilp.

Pure Imagination: The World of Anthony Newley and Leslie Briccuse, devised and directed by Bruce Kimmel, opened at the Pacific Resident Theatre in Venice, California, on 7 December 2013.

David Bowie
Newley was an early influence on the rock musician David Bowie, who was a fan of his. The producer of Bowie's first album, Mike Vernon, even described his first impression of Bowie as "a young Anthony Newley". Rolling Stone noted that Bowie's singing on the album was "delivered in an overenunciating voice that was deeply indebted to popular English actor-singer Anthony Newley." After Newley died, Bowie recorded one of his songs, "What Kind of Fool Am I?", as a tribute.

Discography

Albums

Studio albums
 1955 Cranks (HMV CLP1082)(Original London Cast)
 1960 Love Is a Now and Then Thing (Decca LK4343; London LL3156, UK #19)
 1961 Tony (Decca LK4406; London PS244)
 1964 In My Solitude (Decca LK4600, RCA Victor LSP-2925 )
 1965 Who Can I Turn To? (RCA Victor LPM-3347 [Mono]; RCA Victor LSP-3347 [Stereo])
 1966 Who Can I Turn To? (RCA Victor 7737 [Mono]; RCA Victor 7737 [Stereo])
 1966 Newley Delivered (Decca LK4654)
 1966 Newley Recorded (RCA Victor RD7873; RCA Victor LSP-3614)
 1966 The Genius of Anthony Newley (London PS361)
 1967 Anthony Newley Sings the Songs from Doctor Dolittle (RCA Victor LSP-3839)
 1969 The Romantic World of Anthony Newley (Decca SPA45)
 1970 For You (Bell Records 1101)
 1971 Pure Imagination (MGM SE4781)
 1972 Ain't It Funny (MGM/Verve MV5096)
 1977 The Singer and His Songs (United Artists LA718-G)
 1985 Mr Personality (Decca Tab 84)
 1992 Too Much Woman (BBI (CD); GNP/Crescendo 2243)
 2012 The Last Song – The Final Recordings (Stage Door STAGE 9031)

Compilation albums
 1962 This Is Tony Newley (London LL362)
 1963 Peak Performances (London LL3283)
 1969 The Best of Anthony Newley (RCA Victor LSP4163)
 1990 Anthony Newley's Greatest Hits (Deram 820 694)
 1990 Greatest Hits (Decca)
 1995 The Best of Anthony Newley (GNP Crescendo)
 1996 The Very Best of Anthony Newley (Carlton 30364 00122)
 1997 The Very Best of Anthony Newley (Spectrum Music 552 090-2)
 1997 Once in a Lifetime: The Collection (Razor & Tie RE 2145-2)
 2000 A Wonderful Day Like Today (Camden)
 2000 On a Wonderful Day Like Today: The Anthony Newley Collection (BMG 74321 752592)
 2000 Decca Years 1959–1964 (Decca 466 918-2)
 2001 Best of Anthony Newley (Decca)
 2002 What Kind of Fool Am I? (Armoury)
 2002 Remembering Anthony Newley: The Music, the Life, the Legend (Prism Leisure)
 2003 Stop the World! (Blitz)
 2004 Love Is a Now and Then Thing / In My Solitude (Vocalion)
 2004 Pure Imagination / Ain't It Funny (Edsel)
 2005 The Magic of Anthony Newley (Kala)
 2006 Anthology (Universal/Spectrum)
 2006 Anthony Newley Collection (Universal/Spectrum)
 2006 Newley Delivered (Dutton Vocalion)
 2007 Best of Anthony Newley (Sony)
 2007 Best of Anthony Newley (Camden)
 2010 Newley Discovered (Stage Door Records)

EPs
 1959 Idle on Parade – "I've Waited So Long" / "Idle Rock-a-boogie" / "Idle on Parade" / "Sat'day Night Rock-a-Boogie" (Decca DFE6566, UK No. 13)
 1960 Tony's Hits – "Why" / "Anything You Wanna Do" / "Personality" / "My Blue Angel" (Decca DFE6629)
 1960 More Hits from Tony – "If She Should Come to You" / "Girls Were Made to Love and Kiss" / "Do You Mind" / "Lifetime of Happiness" (Decca DFE6655)
 1961 This Time the Dream's on Me – "Gone with the Wind" / "This Time the Dream's on Me" / "It's the Talk of the Town" / "What's the Good About Goodbye?" (Decca DFE6687)

Singles
 1959 "I've Waited So Long" / "Sat'day Night Rock-a-Boogie" (Decca F11127, UK No. 3)
 1959 "Idle on Parade" / "Idle Rock-A-Boogie" (Decca F11137)
 1959 "Personality" / "My Blue Angel" (Decca F11142, UK No. 6)
 1959 "Someone to Love" / "It's All Over" (Decca F11163)
 1960 "Why" / "Anything You Wanna Do" (Decca F11194, UK No. 1)
 1960 "Do You Mind?" / "Girls Were Made to Love And Kiss" (Decca F11220, UK No. 1; London 1918, US No. 91)
 1960 "If She Should Come to You" / "Lifetime of Happiness" (Decca F11254, UK No. 4; London 1929, US No. 67)
 1960 "Strawberry Fair" / "A Boy Without a Girl" (Decca F11295, UK No. 3)
 1961 "And the Heavens Cried" / "Lonely Boy and Pretty Girl" (Decca F11331, UK No. 6)
 1961 "Pop Goes the Weasel" / "Bee Bom" (Decca F11362, UK No. 12; London 9501, US No. 85)
 1961 "What Kind of Fool Am I?" / "Once in a Lifetime" (Decca F11376, UK No. 36; London 9546, US No. 85)
 1962 "D-Darling" / "I'll Walk Beside You" (Decca F11419, UK No. 25)
 1962 "That Noise" / "The Little Golden Clown" (Decca F11486, UK No. 34)
 1963 "There's No Such Thing As Love" / "She's Just Another Girl" (Decca F11636)
 1963 "The Father of Girls" / "I Love Everything About You" (Decca F11767)
 1964 "Tribute" / "Lament to a Hero" (Decca F11818)
 1964 "Solitude" / "I'll Teach You How to Cry" (Decca F11883)
 1966 "Why Can't You Try to Didgeridoo" / "Is There a Way Back to Your Arms" (RCA RCA1518; RCA 47-8785)
 1966 "Moogies Bloogies" (recorded with Delia Derbyshire) [unreleased demo]
 1967 "Something in Your Smile" / "I Think I Like You" (RCA RCA1637)
 1968 "I'm All I Need" / "When You Gotta Go" (MCA MU1061)
 1968 "Sweet November" (Warner Bros. Records 7174)
 1976 "Teach the Children" (United Artists 825, US Adult Contemporary No. 12)

Recordings of musicals
 1961 Stop the World I Want to Get Off! Original Broadway Cast Album (writer and performer)
 1965 The Roar of the Greasepaint, the Smell of the Crowd Original Broadway Cast Album (writer and performer)
 1966 Stop the World I Want to Get Off! Film Musical Soundtrack (writer)
 1967 Doctor Dolittle Original Film Musical Soundtrack (performer)
 1969 Can Heironymus Merkin Ever Forget Mercy Humppe and Find True Happiness Original Film Musical Soundtrack (writer and performer)
 1971 Willy Wonka and the Chocolate Factory Original Film Musical Soundtrack (writer)
 1972 The Good Old Bad Old Days Original London Cast Album (writer and performer)
 1974 Mr. Quilp Original Film Musical Soundtrack (writer and performer)
 1994 Scrooge Original London Cast Recording (performer)

Theatre
 Cranks (26 November 1956 – 29 December 1956) – Bijou Theatre (performer)
 Stop the World – I Want to Get Off (3 October 1962 – 7 September 1963) – Shubert Theatre / (9 September 1963 – 1 February 1964) Ambassador Theatre (music & lyrics, book, director, performer)
 The Roar of the Greasepaint – The Smell of the Crowd (16 May 1965 – 4 December 1965) – Shubert Theatre (music & lyrics, book, director, performer)
 Anthony Newley / Henry Mancini (31 October 1974 – 10 November 1974) – Uris Theatre (performer) 
 Chaplin (12 August 1983 – 24 September 1983) – Dorothy Chandler Pavilion, Los Angeles (performer)
 Charlie and the Chocolate Factory (23 April 2017 – 14 January 2018) – Lunt-Fontanne Theatre (music & lyrics songs from the motion picture)

Filmography

 Henry V (1944) as Boy in English Camp (uncredited)
 Dusty Bates (1947) as Dusty Bates
 The Little Ballerina (1948) as Johnny
 Vice Versa (1948) as Dick Bultitude/Paul Bultitude
 Oliver Twist (1948) as the Artful Dodger
 The Guinea Pig (1948) as Miles Minor
 Vote for Huggett (1949) as Dudley
 A Boy, a Girl and a Bike  (1949) as Charlie Ritchie
 Don't Ever Leave Me (1949) as Jimmy Knowles
 Madeleine (1950) as Chemist's Assistant (uncredited)
 Highly Dangerous (1950) as Operator (uncredited)
 Top of the Form (1953) as Percy
 Those People Next Door (1953) as Bob Twigg
 Up to His Neck (1954) as Tommy
 Above Us the Waves (1955) as Engineer, X2
 The Blue Peter (1955) as Fred Starling
 The Cockleshell Heroes (1955) as Marine Clarke
 Port Afrique (1956) as Pedro
 The Last Man to Hang? (1956) as Cyril Gaskin
 The Battle of the River Plate (1956) as Radio Operator, Tairoa, Prisoner on Graf Spee (uncredited)
 X the Unknown (1956) as LCpl. 'Spider' Webb
 The Good Companions (1957) as Mulbrau
 Fire Down Below (1957) as Miguel
 How to Murder a Rich Uncle (1957) as Edward
 High Flight (1957) as Roger Endicott
 No Time to Die (1958) as Noakes
 The Man Inside (1958) as Ernesto
 The Lady Is a Square (1959) as Freddy
 Idol on Parade (1959) as Jeep Jackson
 The Bandit of Zhobe (1959) as Cpl. Stokes
 The Heart of a Man (1959) as Johnnie
 Killers of Kilimanjaro (1959) as Hooky Hook
 Jazz Boat (1960) as Bert Harris
 Let's Get Married (1960) as Dickie Bird
 In the Nick (1960) as Dr. Newcombe
 The Small World of Sammy Lee (1963) as Sammy 'Lee' Leeman
 Doctor Dolittle (1967) as Matthew Mugg
 Sweet November (1968) as Charlie Blake
 Can Hieronymus Merkin Ever Forget Mercy Humppe and Find True Happiness? (1969) as Heironymus Merkin
 Summertree (director, 1971)
 It Seemed Like a Good Idea at the Time (1975) as Sweeney
 The Old Curiosity Shop (1975) as Daniel Quilp
 Alice in Wonderland (1985) as The Mad Hatter
 Stagecoach (1986) as Trevor Peacock
 The Garbage Pail Kids Movie (1987) as Captain Manzini
 Coins in the Fountain (1990) as Alfred
 Polly Comin' Home (Made for TV, 1990) as Dabney Mayhew
 Boris and Natasha: The Movie (1992) as Sal Manelli
 Gone to Seed (1992) as DI Keet

Awards and nominations

References

External links
 – official site

Anthony Newley at Stagedoorrecords.com
Anthony Newley at Users.bestweb.net
Anthony Newley unreleased recording done with Delia Derbyshire, of BBC Radiophonic Workshop fame, plus some of her thoughts on the experience

1931 births
1999 deaths
20th-century British male singers
20th-century classical musicians
20th-century English male actors
20th-century English male writers
20th-century English singers
Alumni of the Italia Conti Academy of Theatre Arts
British expatriate male actors in the United States
Broadway composers and lyricists
Deaths from kidney cancer
Deaths from liver cancer
Deaths from lung cancer in Florida
Decca Records artists
English crooners
English male film actors
English Jews
English male musical theatre actors
English musical theatre composers
English musical theatre lyricists
English male composers
English male soap opera actors
English male singer-songwriters
Grammy Award winners
Jewish English male actors
Jewish songwriters
London Records artists
People from Hackney Central
People from Jensen Beach, Florida
RCA Victor artists
Traditional pop music singers